Likouala may refer to:

 Likouala Department, Republic of the Congo
 Likouala-Mossaka, a tributary of the Congo River
 Likouala-aux-Herbes, a tributary of the Sangha River